The United States's Whetstone nuclear test series was a group of 46 nuclear tests conducted in 1964–1965. These tests followed the Operation Niblick series and preceded the Operation Flintlock series.

Two tests were conducted during this series by the United Kingdom: Cormorant and Courser.

References

Explosions in 1964
Explosions in 1965
Whetstone
1964 in military history
1965 in military history
1964 in Nevada
1965 in Nevada
1964 disasters in the United States
1965 disasters in the United States
1964 in the environment
1965 in the environment